Fredrik Dahlström (born 1 November 1971) is a Swedish former footballer who played as a forward.

Honours

Club 

 Djurgårdens IF 
 Division 1 Norra (1): 1998

References

Association football forwards
Swedish footballers
Allsvenskan players
Ettan Fotboll players
Malmö FF players
1971 births
Living people
Djurgårdens IF Fotboll players
Assyriska FF players